The voice from sky, according to Shia Islamic eschatology, will be words spoken by Jibrael which is one of the signs of Mahdi's appearance.

Purview 
The voice from sky by Gabriel is amongst five certain signs for appearance of Mahdi. The voice will be heard by everyone of their own language. Sky is introduced as the sound source in many narrations. The voice can be heard from near and far alike and will awaken sleeping people. It is mercy for the believers and for disbelievers is the torment, then Mahdi will become renowned.

Time 
Though the voice from sky is claimed as a convinced sign but there is a discrepancy in the event time. According to a narration from Muhammad al-Baqir this voice will be heard in Ramadan before reappearance of Muhammad al-Mahdi. In compliance with Al-Shaykh Al-Mufid, as well as others, there is a Hadith which state a synchronicity between reappearance of Muhammad al-Mahdi and the voice from sky. Based on another narration it will happen on Thursday night, twenty-third day of Ramadan.

Content 
As claimed by most narration, contents of the voice will be about Muhammad al-Mahdi and his characteristics; and it will invite people towards him. Also, Shiite victory will be mentioned.

Voice of Satan 
It has been narrated about the voice of Satan at the end of the day of heavenly voice, which its aim is making doubts to follow Muhammad al-Mahdi.

See also 

 Sufyani
 Khasf al-Bayda'
 Al-Yamani (Shiism)
 Nafs-e-Zakiyyah (Pure soul)
 Reappearance of Muhammad al-Mahdi
 Signs of the reappearance of Muhammad al-Mahdi

References 

Shia eschatology
Islamic terminology
Mahdism